Daniel Edward Garrett (April 28, 1869 – December 13, 1932) was a Democratic U.S. Representative from Texas, elected at large and later from the 8th District of Texas.

Early life and career in politics
Garrett was born near Springfield, Tennessee, in Robertson County, and he attended the common schools of his native county. He studied law and was admitted to the bar and commenced practice in Springfield, Tennessee, in 1893. He was elected as member of the Tennessee House of Representatives from 1892–1896. Subsequently, Garrett was elected to the Tennessee State senate in 1902 and again in 1904.

Moved to Texas
He moved to Houston, Texas, in 1905 and continued the practice of law. Garrett was elected at-large as a Democrat to the Sixty-third Congress from (March 4, 1913 – March 3, 1915). He was defeated for reelection in 1914 by James H. Davis and he resumed the practice of law in Houston. In 1917, Garrett ran again against Davis for the at-large seat and won, serving from (March 4, 1917 – March 3, 1919). He was not a candidate for renomination in 1918.

In 1920, Garrett ran for election to the vacant 8th District seat which comprised the city of Houston and the surrounding counties, when Joe H. Eagle retired. Garrett was elected and served from March 4, 1921, until his death. He died in Washington, D.C., on December 13, 1932. He is interred in Forest Park Cemetery in Houston.

Memorials
The Liberty Ship USS Daniel E. Garrett was named for the congressman and was deployed during World War II.

See also
 List of United States Congress members who died in office (1900–49)

Sources

1869 births
1932 deaths
Democratic Party members of the United States House of Representatives from Texas
Democratic Party members of the Tennessee House of Representatives
Democratic Party Tennessee state senators